Salem University is a private for-profit university in Salem, West Virginia. It has about 250 students on campus and about 600 online students that are enrolled in undergraduate as well as graduate programs. The university was founded by the Seventh Day Baptist Church in 1888.

History
The school was founded after the Eastern Seventh Day Baptist Association decided to build an academy in the city of Salem. The state granted a permit in December 1888 to build what was called the Academy of Salem, specifying that the institution was subject to the regulations and decisions of the Society of Seventh Day Baptist Education. The charter required the institution to make a college as soon as possible, which occurred in 1890. Over the next 100 years, the school continued as a liberal arts, teacher education, and nursing college.

In 1989, Salem formed an alliance with Teikyo University of Tokyo, Japan, which changed the focus of the school to one of education of international students. Salem College was renamed Salem-Teikyo University. The alliance with Teikyo ended in 2000, when the school was purchased by investors from Singapore. At that time, the school changed its name to Salem International University. Salem International University was acquired by Salem Education LLC in June 2005. The school was renamed Salem University in September 2017.

The Salem College Administration Building was listed on the National Register of Historic Places in 1989.

Academics
Salem is accredited by the Higher Learning Commission. The university offers undergraduate degrees including the Associate of Arts, Associate of Science, Bachelor of Arts, and Bachelor of Science. The School of Nursing offers a Bachelor of Science in Nursing (a degree-completion program for registered nurses) and an Associate of Science in Nursing that prepares students to become Registered Nurses.

At the graduate level, Salem offers a Master of Business Administration, a Master of Education, and a Master of Science in Nursing. Teachers may take courses in the School of Education as non-degree students to renew their licenses. A post-master's certificate in Educational Leadership is offered that leads to advanced licensure and a certificate in Special Education Leadership is also offered.

All programs, including distance education programs, are delivered in a monthly format allowing students to complete their degrees more quickly than their counterparts at other traditional or online universities. This attracts non-traditional students conscious of time and accessibility.

Since classes are four weeks long, the MBA or M.Ed. can be completed in 12 months or fewer, a Bachelor's in 40 months, or an Associate in only 20 months, if a student were to start college studies without any prior college credits.

Athletics
The Salem athletic teams are called the Tigers. The university is a member of the Division II level of the National Collegiate Athletic Association (NCAA), primarily competing as an NCAA D-II Independent for most of its sports since the 2016–17 academic year (which they were a member on a previous stint from 2010–11 to 2012–13); while being an associate member of the Eastern College Athletic Conference (ECAC) for some of its sports. The Tigers previously competed as a member of the Great Midwest Athletic Conference (G-MAC) from 2013–14 to 2015–16; as well as a charter member of the defunct West Virginia Intercollegiate Athletic Conference (WVIAC) from 1924–25 to 2009–10. 

Salem competes in 17 intercollegiate varsity sports: Men's sports include baseball, basketball, cross country, soccer, swimming, tennis, track & field and water polo; while women's sports basketball, cross country, soccer, softball, swimming, tennis, track & field, volleyball and water polo.

G-MAC tenure
Salem is one of four West Virginia schools that joined the G-MAC in July 2013. The other three schools were former WVIAC colleagues of Salem that had been cast adrift in the breakup of the WVIAC.  Salem left the G-MAC at the end of the 2015–16 season. According to an official statement issued by the G-MAC: “Salem International will be conducting a final year of (G-MAC) affiliation in 2015-2016. The institution is exploring alternate Division II conference membership options beginning with the 2016–17 season.” As of the 2022–23 school year, Salem remains an independent NCAA Division II institution with no conference affiliation in basketball, baseball, softball, volleyball and soccer. The Salem men's and women's swimming programs compete as an affiliate member in Conference Carolinas.

Water polo
Salem's women's water polo team faced Marist in the opening round of the 2021 NCAA Women's Water Polo Championship, in a losing effort 9–8.

Notable alumni

 John Abramovic, former National Basketball Association (NBA) forward
 Terry Bowden, former football coach at Salem, Samford University, and Auburn University, the University of North Alabama, the University of Akron and current football coach at the University of Louisiana at Monroe
 Mike Carey, head coach of the women's basketball team at West Virginia University
 Jack Deloplaine, former National Football League (NFL) running back
 Larry J. Edgell, member of the West Virginia Senate
 Dave Ewart, Arena Football League coach
 Jimbo Fisher, former quarterback (1985–86) and head football coach at Texas A&M University
 Scott Hilton, former NFL player
 Rush Holt Sr., former United States Senator from West Virginia
 Monty Hunter, former NFL player
 Arthur Katalayi, senior advisor and global ambassador at Giving Back to Africa
 Dennis Knight, retired professional wrestler
 Orson Mobley, former NFL player
 Matthew M. Neely, politician who served in both houses of the United States Congress and as Governor of West Virginia
 Brian Pederson, American soccer player playing for Rochester Thunder
 Jennings Randolph, former United States Representative (1933–1947) and United States Senator (1958–1985)
 Jess Rodriguez, former NFL player
 Rich Rodriguez, football coach at Salem, West Virginia University, the University of Michigan, and the University of Arizona
 Joseph Rosier, former United States Senator from West Virginia
 Archie Talley, all-American basketball player who led the nation in scoring (1976). Played professionally for the New York Knicks, Harlem Globetrotters, and in Europe.  Currently a motivational speaker.
 Cecil Underwood, former Governor of West Virginia
 Michael B. Surbaugh , Chief Scout Executive Boy Scouts of America.

References

External links
 Official website
 Official athletics website

 
Private universities and colleges in West Virginia
Education in Harrison County, West Virginia
Educational institutions established in 1888
For-profit universities and colleges in the United States
1888 establishments in West Virginia
Seventh Day Baptists